The 2015 ADAC GT Masters season was the ninth season of the ADAC GT Masters, the grand tourer-style sports car racing founded by the German automobile club ADAC. The season started on 25 April at Motorsport Arena Oschersleben and ended on 4 October at Hockenheim after eight double-header meetings. René Rast and Kelvin van der Linde entered the season as the defending Drivers' Champions. Prosperia C. Abt Racing entered the season as the defending Teams' Champion.

The series changed tyre supplier from Yokohama to Pirelli.

Entry list

Race calendar and results
The eight-event calendar for the 2015 season was announced on 21 November 2014.

Championship standings
Scoring system
Championship points were awarded for the first ten positions in each race. Entries were required to complete 75% of the winning car's race distance in order to be classified and earn points. Individual drivers were required to participate for a minimum of 25 minutes in order to earn championship points in any race.

Drivers' championship

Notes
1 – Albert von Thurn und Taxis was a guest driver at Zandvoort and therefore ineligible to score championship points.

Teams' championship

References

External links
 

ADAC GT Masters season
ADAC GT Masters seasons